Neosho Commercial Historic District is a national historic district located at Neosho, Newton County, Missouri.   The district encompasses 38 contributing buildings in the central business district of Neosho.  It developed between about 1868 and 1943, and includes representative examples of Victorian and Modern Movement architecture. Notable buildings include the Newton County Courthouse (1936), Newton County Jail (1888), Haas Building (1906), First National Bank (1922), Auditorium and City Hall (1938), Masonic Lodge (1883, 1913), and Newton County Bank (1884).

It was listed on the National Register of Historic Places in 1993, with a boundary increase in 2007.

References

Historic districts on the National Register of Historic Places in Missouri
Modernist architecture in Missouri
Victorian architecture in Missouri
Buildings and structures in Newton County, Missouri
National Register of Historic Places in Newton County, Missouri